Richard Greenwood (20 July 1905 – 18 September 1987) was  a former Australian rules footballer who played with Footscray in the Victorian Football League (VFL).

Notes

External links 
		

1905 births
1987 deaths
Australian rules footballers from Victoria (Australia)
Western Bulldogs players
Camberwell Football Club players